Wormley's Hotel was a five-story hotel at 1500 H Street, NW, Washington, D.C. It was opened in 1871. The hotel was owned by James Wormley, a free-born black man who had spent time in Europe learning fine culinary skills. The hotel became a hub for both local and foreign government officials. The hotel was the site of the Wormley Agreement, which led to the Compromise of 1877 and the election of President Rutherford B. Hayes. James Wormley died in 1884 and his son took over the business until he sold it in 1893.  The hotel was later demolished and the Union Trust Company built on its site in 1906.

References

External links
 Streets of Washington: The talented Mr. James Wormley

Sources
Sandra Fitzpatrick and Maria R. Goodwin, The Guide to Black Washington, rev. ed. (New York: Hippocrene Books, 1999), 193-194.

Demolished buildings and structures in Washington, D.C.
Demolished hotels in the United States
Hotels in Washington, D.C.